John Miller "Ian" McColl (7 June 1927 – 25 October 2008) was a Scottish football player and manager. McColl played as a defender for Queen's Park and Rangers, while he also represented both the Scotland national team and the Scottish League. After retiring as a player, he managed the Scotland national team and English club Sunderland.

Early life
Born in Alexandria, West Dunbartonshire, the grandson of Scotland international William McColl, McColl developed his footballing skills with Vale of Leven (Juniors), and joined Queen's Park in 1943 when he moved to Glasgow to study engineering at the University of Glasgow. He continued his studies after turning professional and later worked as a qualified engineer.

Playing career
Rangers manager Bill Struth signed McColl in 1945. During his 15-year spell at Ibrox, he won six League championships, five Scottish Cups and two League Cups. He captained the club during the 1950s and was part of what was known as the Iron Curtain defence, alongside the likes of Sammy Cox, Willie Woodburn and George Young.

His final appearance for Rangers was in the 1960 Scottish Cup Final, a 2–0 win against Kilmarnock. He made a total of 575 appearances for the Glasgow club in all competitions. He also won 14 caps for Scotland and represented the Scottish League XI.

Managerial career
After his playing career, he quickly went into management. He was appointed manager of Scotland in 1960 and enjoyed a winning start, beating Northern Ireland 5–2 at Hampden Park. Under McColl's managership, Scotland won British Home Championships in 1962 and 1963. The team beat England 2–0 at Hampden and 2–1 at Wembley in the process. Other notable results under his tenure include a 6–2 win against Spain in Madrid, a 6–1 win over Northern Ireland in Belfast and a 6–1 win over Norway in Glasgow. He was in charge of Scotland for a total of 27 matches, winning 16 of them. This gave him a winning percentage of 59.3%, the second best of any Scotland manager.

McColl was appointed manager of Sunderland in 1965. Despite signing Jim Baxter, McColl was unable to make Sunderland into a successful side. He was sacked by Sunderland in 1968 and spent the rest of his working life as a civil engineer.

Honours

Player
Rangers
Scottish league champions (7): 1946–47; 1948–49; 1949–50; 1952–53; 1955–56; 1956–57; 1958–59
Scottish Cup winners (4): 1948–49, 1949–50, 1952–53, 1959–60
Scottish League Cup winners: 1946–47, 1948–49

Manager
Scotland
British Home Championship winners: 1962; 1963

Career statistics

International appearances

Managerial record

References

External links

Rangers F.C. Hall of Fame
Telegraph Obituary
Times Obituary

1958 FIFA World Cup players
Alumni of the University of Glasgow
Queen's Park F.C. players
Rangers F.C. players
Scotland international footballers
Scotland national football team managers
Scottish football managers
Scottish expatriate football managers
Scottish footballers
Sunderland A.F.C. managers
People from Alexandria, West Dunbartonshire
Scottish Football League players
Scottish Football League representative players
United Soccer Association coaches
1927 births
2008 deaths
Association football defenders
Footballers from West Dunbartonshire
Vale of Leven F.C. players
Scottish Junior Football Association players